Reckange-sur-Mess is a commune and small town in south-western Luxembourg. It is part of the canton of Esch-sur-Alzette.

The commune comprises the villages of Reckange-sur-Mess, Ehlange-sur-Mess, Limpach, Roedgen, Pissange and Wickrange.

It is situated on the Mess River, from which its suffix is derived.

Population

References

External links
 

 
Communes in Esch-sur-Alzette (canton)
Towns in Luxembourg